Bonita is an unincorporated community in Graham County, Arizona, United States.

References

Unincorporated communities in Graham County, Arizona
Unincorporated communities in Arizona